The March 82G is a IMSA GTP/Group C sports prototype race car, designed, developed and built by British manufacturer and constructor March Engineering, for sports car racing (specifically the IMSA GT Championship and World Sportscar Championship), in 1982. It competed in motor racing between 1982 and 1986, but only scored 1 race win, 8 podium finishes, and 2 pole positions. It was powered by a naturally-aspirated   Chevrolet V8 engine.

References

Racing cars
March vehicles
Sports prototypes
IMSA GTP cars
Group C cars